Chamila Gamage (Sinhala: චමිල ගමගේ) is a Sri Lankan Contemporary Artist and Sculptor. His innate talent can be seen through number of different mediums including painting and drawing, sculpting and set designing. Chamila's styles are abstract art, modern art, expressionism art.

Personal life 
Chamila Gamage was born on 9 August 1978 in Beliatta, Sri Lanka. His parents are Mahantha Gamage Nimal Pemarathna. (father) and Wickramarathna Bandaranayakalage Wasantha (mother). He was the third child of a family of three boys and a girl. Chamila married Nishadi Thilakawardana on 22 May 2009. They move to Pannipitiya, where his art gallery and home located.

Education 
Chamila was sent to a school in Beliatta called Beliatta Central College. He earned a Bachelor of Fine Arts in Painting and Sculpture from University of the Visual and Performing Arts, Colombo, Sri Lanka and Master of fine Arts from University of Kelaniya, Sri Lanka.

Career 

His innate talent can be seen through number of different mediums including painting and drawing, sculpting and Set designing. Chamila believes that a drawing displayed in simple and crude lines, can tell a story to the viewer tapping into most basic human senses regardless of culture and language. He shows his artistic abilities in number of different genres including history, war, sexuality, and religion. His artwork has been shown in number of solo exhibitions throughout Sri Lanka and he also participated in international group exhibitions including Human Nature (2020, Germany), Art Exchange Exhibition (2018, China), and 17th Asian Art Biennale (2017, Bangladesh). His work permanently display at The Galle Fort Art Gallery, Tintagel Colombo, CA Collectors Gallery, Barefoot Gallery, Venusberg 6, Horagolla Stables and The Bungalow at Karma House.

Chamila currently works as an Art Director & Set Designer in Sri Lanka Rupavahini Corporation, Sri Lanka. Also, he is lecturing in painting and sculpture at Cultural Center University of Sri Jayewardenepura and Department of Faculty of Visual Arts and University of the Visual and Performing Arts Colombo, Sri Lanka. Chamila was influenced by Pablo Picasso, Frida Kahlo, Kandyan Era Frescoes, Anselm Kiefer, Subodh Gupta, Saskia Pintelon, H A Karunaratne.

Solo Exhibitions

Group Exhibitions

References 

Living people
1978 births
Sinhalese artists
21st-century Sri Lankan painters
21st-century Sri Lankan people
Contemporary artists
Sri Lankan contemporary artists
Sri Lankan painters
Sri Lankan sculptors
Sri Lankan illustrators
People from Southern Province, Sri Lanka